The 1962 Arizona gubernatorial election took place on November 6, 1962. Incumbent Governor Paul Fannin ran for reelection against President of the Western Conference of United Funds Samuel Pearson Goddard in the general election, winning a third consecutive term, a first for a Republican Governor in Arizona. Fannin was sworn into his third term on January 1, 1963.

Republican primary

Candidates
 Paul Fannin, incumbent Governor

Democratic primary

Candidates
 Samuel P. Goddard, president of the Western Conference of United Funds
 Joe C. Haldiman, Democratic nominee for governor in 1952
 J. Michael Morris

Results

General election

Results

References

1962
1962 United States gubernatorial elections
Gubernatorial
November 1962 events in the United States